Garah may refer to:
Garah, Afghanistan
 Garah, New South Wales, Australia